The 1967 Stanford Indians football team represented Stanford University during the 1967 NCAA University Division football season. The Indians were coached by John Ralston in his fifth season.

Schedule

Players drafted by the NFL

References

Stanford
Stanford Cardinal football seasons
Stanford Indians football